The Battle of Rueda (981) was a battle of the Spanish Reconquista between the Muslim forces of Al-Andalus and a coalition of north-Iberian Christian states. Due to the difficulty in interpreting the various chronicles, historians are still debating the site of the battle. According to Reinhart Dozy, the battle was fought in Rueda in Valladolid, whereas Ruiz Asencio considers that it was Roa, in Burgos, a fortress that had been repopulated in 912.

The Muslim forces were commanded by Almanzor, while the Christian troops were a combined force and the combined from the kingdoms of León and Navarre, plus the County of Castile, led by King Ramiro III of León, García Fernández of Castile and Sancho II of Pamplona. The battle ended in a disastrous defeat for the Christian kingdoms and resulted in the rebellion of the Galician nobles and the eventual abdication of King Ramiro III in favor of Bermudo II of León.

The battle followed a similar defeat at the Battle of Torrevicente.

References

Sources 
 

Rueda
Rueda
Rueda
10th century in the Kingdom of León
Province of Valladolid
981
Rueda
Rueda
Rueda